Chrysocraspeda aurantibasis is a species of moth of the  family Geometridae. It is found in North Madagascar.

The male of this moth has a reddish head and the antennae are bipectinated over 2/3 of their length. The upperside of its body is acajou-brown,  underside and legs are yellowish. The first two pairs of the legs have a reddish front side.
The upper side of the forewings are acajou-brown with a large red-orange spot at its base and two sinuated lines of the same colour. The underside is pale pinkish.
The hindwings have a similar coloration but their underside is whitish.

The length of the forewings is 9mm.

The holotype had been collected at the route d'Anosibe, Ampitameloka, altitude 840 m.

References

Sterrhinae
Moths described in 1970
Lepidoptera of Madagascar
Moths of Madagascar
Moths of Africa